Museum Night is an annual event in several cities in Flanders and the Netherlands. Museums will collaborate and people will be able to buy one ticket to access all the participating museums in a particular city.

One of the most popular events is Museum Night in Amsterdam  , but other events are also held in cities like Almere, Antwerp, Breda, Brussels, The Hague, Delft, Ghent, Leiden, Maastricht, Ostend, Roermond, Rotterdam, Utrecht and many more.

The participating Amsterdam museums are yearly opened on the first Saturday of November from 7 pm until 2 am the next day. Besides the normal exhibitions in museums, activities are arranged, like artist performances and free guides. In some events, public transport can be freely used for people who bought a ticket.

References

Entertainment events in the Netherlands
Entertainment events in Belgium
Museum events